Thady Windham Thomas Wyndham-Quin, 7th Earl of Dunraven and Mount-Earl (27 October 1939 – 25 March 2011) was an Irish peer.

Early life
He was educated at Ludgrove School and Institut Le Rosey, Switzerland. While a schoolboy, he was disabled by polio.

He succeeded to the earldom in 1965 on the death of his father, Richard Wyndham-Quin, 6th Earl of Dunraven.

Career
Lord Dunraven sold Adare Manor and its contents in 1984 to Irish-American businessman Tom Kane, and the manor was converted into the Adare Manor Hotel. Thereafter he lived with his family in a nearby house called Kilgobbin House.

He was chairman of the Irish Wheelchair Association for two decades. The Dunraven Centre, a disability resource centre at Limerick Enterprise Development Park, is named after him.

Family
In 1969, he married Geraldine McAleer, daughter of Air Commodore Gerard W. McAleer, CBE, MB, BCh. They had one child, a daughter:
Lady Ana Wyndham-Quin (born 1972). m. Duncan Johnson in 2009.

Death
Lord Dunraven died at his home on 25 March 2011, aged 71. The earldom and his other titles became extinct on his death.

Ancestry

References

External links
Thady Wyndham-Quin, 7th Earl of Dunraven and Mount-Earl
ancestry

1939 births
2011 deaths
People educated at Ludgrove School
Alumni of Institut Le Rosey
Nobility from County Limerick
People with polio
People associated with Sandleford, Berkshire
Royalty and nobility with disabilities
Earls of Dunraven and Mount-Earl